Abdul-Azeez Olajide Adediran popularly known as Jandor, is a Nigerian politician, journalist, entrepreneur, and technocrat. He is the chairman of Lagos4Lagos movement and the Lagos State Gubernatorial candidate under the People's Democratic Party  with his running mate, Funke Akindele. He is a recipient of the 2021 Honorary Doctorate in Leadership and Governance by South American University, Lagos, Nigeria.

Early life and education 
Jandor was born into the family of Alhaji Adeniran and Late Mrs Ruth Oluwafunmilayo Adeniran on 25 November 1977 in Mushin Area of Lagos State.  Jandor is a graduate of The Polytechnic Ibadan; Modul University, Vienna; the Howard University School of Business, Washington DC, USA; and Oxford University, Oxford, United Kingdom.

Career 
Jandor started his career with Journalism and he  was a journalist for more than twenty years. He eventually ventured into politics as a member of APC. He was the convener of the movement of Lagos4Lagos, a movement under the APC. He eventually defected to PDP and he is currently their gubernatorial candidate of the 2023 Lagos gubernatorial election.

Personal life 
He is married to Maryam Olajide Adediran and they have two children; Fareedah Oluwamayokun Amoke and Fadhilulah Oluwamurewa Adedayo Akanniade Olajide-Adediran.

References 

Living people
1977 births
Nigerian politicians
Nigerian Muslims
Lagos State